This is a list of the Swiss Hitparade number ones of 2013.

Swiss charts

Romandie charts

References 
 Swisschart No.1 Singles and Albums 2013
Swiss Romandie Singles Chart

Number-one hits
Switzerland
2013